Darick Kobie Morris (born 15 July 1995) is a Croatian professional footballer who plays as a centre-back for Slovenian PrvaLiga side Mura.

Club career

Early career
Born in Syracuse, New York to an African-American father and a Croatian mother, Morris moved to Zagreb, Croatia when he was less than a year old. Initially a right winger, he subsequently moved to right-back and then centre-back in the NK Zagreb academy, where he spent almost his entire youth career.

Dinamo Zagreb
In 2013, as a former Croatia U17 international, he moved to the Dinamo Zagreb Academy. In 2014, he became a regular in Dinamo's reserve team, a position he would hold for four subsequent seasons, mainly in the Druga HNL. Morris made his first-team debut in 2015, in the 7–1 cup win against Oštrc Zlatar, scoring in the process.

The same year, on 25 September, he made his Prva HNL debut as well, coming in for Josip Pivarić in the second half of a 4–1 home win against Osijek. He would go on to make just one further top-tier appearance for the club, in a 1–0 win against Lokomotiva in September 2016.

Domžale
In June 2018, Morris signed a three-year contract with Slovenian PrvaLiga club Domžale. He made his debut for Domžale on 5 August 2018, in a 5–1 away loss against Mura. Morris left the club in June 2019.

Tuzla City
On 14 June 2019, Morris signed a two-year contract with Bosnian Premier League club Tuzla City. He made his debut on 20 July 2019, in a 5–1 away league win against Zvijezda 09.

International career
Morris represented Croatia at various youth levels. He played for the under-17, under-19, under-20, and under-21 national teams.

Honours
Dinamo Zagreb
Prva HNL: 2015–16, 2017–18
Croatian Cup: 2015–16, 2017–18

References

External links
 

1995 births
Living people
Sportspeople from Syracuse, New York
Footballers from Zagreb
Croatian people of African-American descent
Association football central defenders
Croatian footballers
Croatia youth international footballers
Croatia under-21 international footballers
GNK Dinamo Zagreb players
GNK Dinamo Zagreb II players
NK Domžale players
FK Tuzla City players
NŠ Mura players
Croatian Football League players
First Football League (Croatia) players
Slovenian PrvaLiga players
Premier League of Bosnia and Herzegovina players
Croatian expatriate footballers
Expatriate footballers in Slovenia
Croatian expatriate sportspeople in Slovenia
Expatriate footballers in Bosnia and Herzegovina
Croatian expatriate sportspeople in Bosnia and Herzegovina